Abaviyeh (also Romanized as ‘Abāvīyeh; also known as ‘Abārīyeh) is a village in Esmailiyeh Rural District, in the Central District of Ahvaz County, Khuzestan Province, Iran. At the 2006 census, its population was 23, in 5 families.

References 

Populated places in Ahvaz County